Patrick Ali Pahlavi (born 1 September 1947) is a member of the deposed Pahlavi dynasty of Iran and was heir presumptive from 1954 to 1960. According to the former constitution of Iran Patrick was the first in the line of succession to the throne. In 1960, however, with the birth of Reza Pahlavi, the latter became the heir apparent. If the Iranian monarchy were to be restored, he would become the heir presumptive to the throne.

Early life

Born in Paris, Patrick Ali Pahlavi is a son of Prince Ali Reza Pahlavi and his wife Christiane Cholewski (or Choleski), a Frenchwoman, of Polish descent (although no record of his parents' 20 November 1946 wedding in the 16th arrondissement of Paris, France, is on official record there). His father chose for him an Irish name popular in France, 'Patrick', and his mother chose for him a Muslim name, 'Ali', which made 'Patrick Ali' his full given name. On his birth he was baptized. Christiane had a son from a previous marriage, "Joachim Christian Philippe Pahlavi", born 15 September 1941.

As his father was the second son of Reza Shah, founder of the Pahlavi dynasty and Shah of Iran, Patrick Ali is a nephew of Mohammad Reza Pahlavi, the last Shah. His father was the heir presumptive to his sonless brother's throne and following his death in a plane crash in 1954, Patrick Pahlavi succeeded him as heir presumptive.

In February 1955, Prince Patrick Ali was at the centre of a dispute between his mother and his uncle, Mohammad Reza Pahlavi the Shah. As heir to the throne, his uncle wanted him enrolled at the Maria Jose School in Switzerland to receive a "proper court education" while his mother wanted to take him to Paris so he would be closer to her. Because of the dispute, he was placed in "protective custody" with policemen guarding his suite at the Hotel Excelsior in Italy until his mother gave into the Shah's demands and he was enrolled at the school. In March, Pahlavi's mother took him from his school without the Iranian embassy or the Swiss authorities knowing.

In 1960, with the birth of a son for his uncle, Pahlavi lost his place as first in the line of succession to the Iranian throne.

When he returned to Iran in the beginning of the 1970s, he spoke out publicly about the corruption of the regime of his uncle the Shah. In 1975, he was arrested and jailed at Evin prison, where he faced daily interrogations and psychological torture, including a fake execution.

Exile

Following the Iranian revolution and overthrow of the Shah in early 1979, Pahlavi was the only prince to remain in Iran. He writes, "There, the Clergy was divided about me. There was those who saw in me the danger of a return to the Pahlavi and those who saw in me a possible solution. Four times I was brought to Evin prison again and four times my partisans released me." He left for exile three days before he was due to go on trial where he might have faced a death sentence.

Pahlavi studied and practiced a number of religions and spiritualities, including Taoism, Buddhism (Zen), Hinduism (Advaita), Judaism, Christianity and Islam over a forty-year period.

Pahlavi was married in 1972 to Sonja Lauman; together they have three sons:
 Prince Davoud Pahlavi (born 7 July 1972)
 Prince Houd Pahlavi (born 26 November 1973)
 Prince Mohammad Pahlavi (born 19 May 1976)

References

External links

 Website of Patrick Ali Pahlavi

Patrick Ali
Mazandarani people
1947 births
Living people
French people of Iranian descent
French people of Polish descent
Nobility from Paris
Exiles of the Iranian Revolution in Switzerland
Iranian people of Polish descent
Iranian princes
Iranian royalty
Pahlavi pretenders to the Iranian throne
French expatriates in Switzerland
Iranian emigrants to Switzerland